The province of Papua (Provinsi Papua) in Indonesia is divided into eight kabupaten (regencies) and one independent kota (city) which in turn are divided administratively into districts, known as distrik under the law of 2001 on "special autonomy for Papua province".

List
The districts of Papua (as now reduced by the reorganisation of July 2022, which separated twenty regencies previously part of Papua Province into three new provinces of Central Papua, Highland Papua and South Papua) and their respective regencies are as follows (as of December 2019). Administrative villages (desa in rural areas and kelurahan in urban areas) are also listed for each district.

See also

List of districts of Central Papua
List of districts of Highland Papua
List of districts of South Papua
List of districts of West Papua

References

 
Papua